St Barnabas Church is a Church of England parish church in Jericho, central Oxford, England, located close to the Oxford Canal.

History
St Barnabas, like many similar churches in the expanding towns and cities of Victorian England, was built to minister to the spiritual and practical needs of the poor and labouring classes. The parish was formed from that of St Paul, Oxford, in 1869; St Paul's was in turn formed from parts of the parishes of St Thomas and St Giles. The church was founded by Thomas Combe (1796–1872), Superintendent of the Oxford University Press close to the church, and his wife Martha (1806–1893), now commemorated by a blue plaque installed by the Oxfordshire Blue Plaques Board. They were supporters of the Oxford Movement (or Tractarian movement). The first Parish Priest was Fr Montague Noel, SSC.  

The architect was Sir Arthur Blomfield, a son of the Bishop of London, who had previously designed the chapel for the Radcliffe Infirmary. The architectural style is that of a Romanesque basilica, possibly modelled on San Clemente in Rome. St Barnabas has a distinctive square tower, in the form of an Italianate campanile, that is visible from the surrounding area. The church was built on land donated by George Ward, a local land owner and member of the influential Ward family (named as the donor in the land conveyance, etc. in the Oxford Diocesan Archives). George's brother William Ward was Mayor of Oxford on two occasions, 1851/2 and 1861/2. It was consecrated in 1869 by Bishop Wilberforce of Oxford and the campanile was completed in 1872. The pulpit was added in 1887 by Heaton, Butler, and Bayne with the panels painted by Charles Floyce.

It has a ring of ten, distinctive, tubular bells, and the hours and quarters are sounded on them.

An associated girls' and infant school for St. Barnabas's was built on a site in Cardigan Street in 1857.

St Barnabas in literature
St Barnabas features in a wide range of literature, from Thomas Hardy through P. D. James. The poet John Betjeman wrote a poem about the church.

Present day
The church maintains the Anglo-Catholic tradition of its foundation. A parish magazine, Jericho Matters, was, until 2020,  produced quarterly and distributed to all of the households and businesses in Jericho. The church hosts many events throughout the year, such as concerts, lectures and exhibitions.  

In September 2015 the parish was united with the neighbouring parish of St Thomas the Martyr, to form the new parish of St Barnabas and St Paul, with St Thomas the Martyr, Oxford. St Barnabas is the parish church and St Thomas is the chapel of ease. The first vicar of the new parish was Fr Jonathan Beswick, SSC. The current Vicar is Fr Christopher Woods, who until February 2019 was Vicar of St Anne's Hoxton in the Diocese of London.

Historically, resolution B (rejecting a woman as incumbent of the parish) had been in place. Since 2018, the parish has received alternative episcopal oversight from the Bishop of Oswestry (formerly the Bishop of Ebbsfleet), the traditionalist catholic provincial episcopal visitor for those who reject the ordination of women as priests and bishops: the reason given for this request was to "maintain the unity of the parish". In November 2022, the parish began a consultation as to whether or not to rescind this arrangement, and in January 2023 the PCC voted by a majority to welcome the ministry of women priests and bishops.

Access
The church is open daily from 9am - 6pm. 

A short guide to the building and its story is available from the church, as is the Emma Bridgewater 'Jericho' mug, commissioned specially for St Barnabas.

Gallery

References

Further reading
Bassett, Arthur Tilney (1919) S. Barnabas', Oxford: a record of fifty years. London: A. R. Mowbray

External links

 St Barnabas Church website
 A Church Near You

19th-century Church of England church buildings
Anglo-Catholic church buildings in Oxfordshire
Bell towers in the United Kingdom
Church of England church buildings in Oxford
Italianate architecture in England
Towers completed in 1872
Religious organizations established in 1869
1869 establishments in England
Oxford Canal
Grade I listed buildings in Oxford
Arthur Blomfield church buildings
Grade I listed churches in Oxfordshire
Italianate church buildings in the United Kingdom
Anglo-Catholic churches in England receiving AEO